Lorenzo Sumulong Sumulong Sr. (September 5, 1905 – October 21, 1997) was a Filipino politician who served in the Philippine Senate for four decades, and as a delegate of his country to the United Nations. He was noted for having engaged in a debate with Nikita Khrushchev at the United Nations General Assembly that allegedly provoked the Soviet Union Premier to bang his shoe on a desk.

Early life and education

Sumulong was born in Antipolo, Rizal. He finished law at the University of the Philippines College of Law and went on to top the 1929 bar examinations. In 1932, he obtained a Masters of Law degree from Harvard Law School.

Political career

Sumulong began his political career as a municipal councilor in Antipolo. In the 1946 general elections, Sumulong won a seat in the House of Representatives, representing the 2nd District of Rizal. In 1949, Sumulong was elected to the Philippine Senate. He won re-election to the Senate in 1955 and in 1961. He did not seek re-election in 1967,  but would return to the Senate in the 1969 elections. In all, Sumulong remained in Congress for 24 years, initially under the Liberal Party, but later under the Nacionalista Party. He served through the 1st Congress until the 7th Congress.

During his 21-year stint as senator, Sumulong became the chairman of the Senate Committee on Public Accountability (also known as the Blue Ribbon Committee). Through that high-profile position, he investigated noted national controversies such as the Tambobong-Buenavista Estate deal and the Harry Stonehill scandals.

Faceoff with Khrushchev

Sumulong also served as chairman of the Senate Foreign Relations committee, and in that capacity, he led a Philippine delegation to the 902nd Plenary Meeting of the United Nations General Assembly in 1960. During that meeting, Sumulong took the floor and delivered the following remarks challenging the Soviet Union to allow the people of Eastern Europe the free exercise of their civil and political rights.

Khrushchev was incensed by Sumulong's remarks. He denounced the Filipino senator as "a jerk, a stooge and a lackey of imperialism". Khrushchev then took out his shoe, waved it at Sumulong, then banged the shoe on the desk in front of him. The following day, Khrushchev acknowledged that he had offended Sumulong but also asserted that he was likewise offended by the delegate from the Philippines.

Later life
Sumulong's service in Congress ended in 1972, with the abolition of the Philippine Senate upon the declaration of martial law by President Ferdinand Marcos. In 1987, President Corazon Aquino named her maternal uncle Lorenzo (sister was Demetria Sumulong Cojuangco) to the Philippine Constitutional Commission of 1986 that drafted the 1987 Philippine Constitution.

Lorenzo is the father of Victor Sumulong, who served as congressman and mayor of Antipolo during the Estrada and Arroyo administrations.

Personal life
Sumulong was married to Estrella Rodriguez and had six children. By way of Francisco Sumulong (born 1695), Sumulong is the fifth cousin thrice removed of Senator Jose W. Diokno, a descendant of Doña Demetria Sumulong y Lindo who moved from Antipolo to Daraga, Albay and Governor-General Felix Berenguer de Marquina.

References

Presidents pro tempore of the Senate of the Philippines
20th-century Filipino lawyers
People from Antipolo
University of the Philippines alumni
Harvard Law School alumni
1905 births
1997 deaths
Senators of the 7th Congress of the Philippines
Senators of the 6th Congress of the Philippines
Senators of the 5th Congress of the Philippines
Senators of the 4th Congress of the Philippines
Senators of the 3rd Congress of the Philippines
Senators of the 2nd Congress of the Philippines
Members of the House of Representatives of the Philippines from Rizal
Liberal Party (Philippines) politicians
Nacionalista Party politicians
Members of the Philippine Constitutional Commission of 1986